John F. Ahearn Jr.  (January 6, 1918 – February 17, 1968) was an American professional basketball player. He played for the Detroit Eagles in the National Basketball League (NBL) and averaged 5.3 points per game. He competed in several other leagues as well.

Ahearn is the cousin of Jerry Bush, who coincidentally also played college basketball at St. John's and then in the NBL.

References

1918 births
1968 deaths
American men's basketball players
Baltimore Bullets (1944–1954) players
Detroit Eagles players
Guards (basketball)
Sportspeople from Brooklyn
Basketball players from New York City
St. John's Red Storm men's basketball players
Wilmington Blue Bombers players